"Operation Heartbreak" is a song written by Al Kasha, Alan Thomas, and Curtis Williams and performed by Aretha Franklin.  The song reached #6 on the U.S. R&B chart in 1961.

The song's A-side, "Rock-a-Bye Your Baby with a Dixie Melody", reached #37 on the Billboard Hot 100.

Chart performance

Aretha Franklin

References

1961 songs
1961 singles
Songs written by Al Kasha
Aretha Franklin songs
Columbia Records singles
Soul songs